Heterachthes tysiphonis is a species of beetle in the family Cerambycidae. It was described by Thomson in 1867.

References

Heterachthes
Beetles described in 1867